Dzherokay is a rural locality (an aul) in Dzherokayskoye Rural Settlement of Shovgenovsky District, the Republic of Adygea, Russia. The population was 1098 as of 2018. There are 16 streets.

Geography 
The aul is located on the Fars River, 9 km southeast of Khakurinokhabl (the district's administrative centre) by road. Svobodny Trud is the nearest rural locality.

Ethnicity 
The aul is inhabited by Circassians.

References 

Rural localities in Shovgenovsky District